Khamis Sirhan Bashar Al-Muhammadi (? –  11 January 2013) was an Iraqi politician and leader of the Arab Socialist Ba'ath Party. He was responsible for the organizations of Karbala province.

Prior to that, he held the position of secretary of the leadership of the Fallujah branch of the Arab Socialist Ba'ath Party, and was a member of the Iraqi National Council.

After the 2003 invasion
His name was included in the list of Iraqis wanted by the United States, and he appeared in a deck of playing cards for the most wanted Iraqis. The forces of the United States of America believed that he was the director of the Al-Rasheed Hotel attacks and the downing of a US Chinook near the city of Fallujah.

In April 2004 the Ba'ath Party announced his expulsion from the party, but he was arrested on December 11, 2004.

He was released on August 4, 2010, after being acquitted of the charges brought against him in the case of draining the marshes.

Death
He died on January 11, 2013.

References

External links

2013 deaths
Members of the Regional Command of the Arab Socialist Ba'ath Party – Iraq Region
Iraq War prisoners of war
Iraqi prisoners of war